Peta Brady (born 1972) is an Australian actress. She is best known for being the second actress to play Cody Willis, a role instituted by Amelia Frid in the TV soap opera Neighbours.  Since she left the show, Brady has appeared in the film Mullet, the TV sitcom Kath & Kim and the SBS series RAN (Remote Area Nurse). In a 2005 theatre role, Brady played 'Annie' in Love by Patricia Cornelius.
At the 2005 Green Room Awards, Brady won the Gerda Nicholson Award for an Actress with an Emerging Career.

Partial filmography
Street Angels (1991)
Neighbours (1993–1996) (TV) as Cody Willis (292 episodes)
Blue Heelers (1997)
Mullet (2001) as Robbie
Kath & Kim (2002–2004) (TV) as Kelly
RAN (Remote Area Nurse) (2006) as Lindy Gaibui
City Homicide (TV) episode "Thai Take Away" (2009) as Kim Charlton
Four of a Kind (2009)
The Slap (2011) as Shamira

References

External links
 

1972 births
Actresses from Melbourne
Australian film actresses
Australian soap opera actresses
Australian stage actresses
Living people
20th-century Australian actresses
21st-century Australian actresses